Peter Nicholas de Putron (born 15 October 1963) is the founder of De Putron Fund Management, G-Research and associated companies.

Background
De Putron grew up in Guernsey, where his father was a local politician. He attended Eton College.  

De Putron graduated from Jesus College, University of Oxford with a Bachelor of Arts and Master of Arts in Engineering Science.

De Putron began his career in the corporate finance department of Royal Bank of Canada in 1985. From 1987 to 1990 he, worked at GNI, a brokerage firm where he traded derivatives. From 1990 to 1992, De Putron attended Wharton School of the University of Pennsylvania graduating in 1992 with a Master of Business Administration in Finance and Entrepreneurial Management. He then worked at IFM, a London-based Hedge Fund where he specialized in market neutral solutions.

De Putron founded De Putron Fund Management in 1997, which had seed money from George Soros. G-Research, a quantitative investment firm is part of the De Putron Fund Management Group. 

De Putron is resident in Jersey. He is regarded as a very private individual.

Political activities
De Putron is the brother-in-law of Andrea Leadsom, a British Conservative Party member of Parliament and financial services minister who was briefly a contender for the position of leader of the Conservative party and hence Prime Minister in July 2016. Leadsom also worked for De Putron Fund Management in the 1990s.

He has donated money to the Leadsom and the Conservative Party, as well as Eurosceptic think tanks.

De Putron was one of those mentioned in the "Jersey files" which were leaked from Kleinwort Benson to the International Consortium of Investigative Journalists.

References 

Conservative Party (UK) donors
Living people
1963 births
People named in the Paradise Papers
Alumni of Jesus College, Oxford
Wharton School of the University of Pennsylvania alumni
People educated at Eton College